Silvernail Homestead is a historic home located at Ancram in Columbia County, New York and Pine Plains, Dutchess County, New York. It is an L-shaped building with a main block, with rear lean-to and ell. The main block is a -story, five-by-two-bay structure with a gable roof in the Greek Revival style. It features a single-story entrance porch with six restored Doric order piers. It has been occupied by five generations of the Silvernail family.

It was listed on the National Register of Historic Places in 2010.

References

Houses on the National Register of Historic Places in New York (state)
Greek Revival houses in New York (state)
Houses completed in 1800
Houses in Columbia County, New York
National Register of Historic Places in Columbia County, New York